Seasteading is the concept of creating permanent dwellings at sea, called seasteads, in international waters outside the territory claimed by any government. 
No one has yet created a structure on the high seas that has been recognized as a sovereign state. Proposed structures have included modified cruise ships, refitted oil platforms, and custom-built floating islands.

Proponents say seasteads can "provide the means for rapid innovation in voluntary governance and reverse environmental damage to our oceans ... and foster entrepreneurship." Some critics fear seasteads may function more as a refuge for the wealthy to avoid taxes or other obligations.

While seasteading gives an impression of freedom from unwanted rules and regulations, the high seas are "some of the most tightly regulated places on Earth" despite appearing borderless and free; in particular the cruise ship industry is highly regulated.

The term seasteading  is a blend of sea and homesteading, and dates back to the 1960s.

History

Many architects and firms have created designs for floating cities, including Vincent Callebaut, Paolo Soleri and companies such as Shimizu, Ocean Builders and E. Kevin Schopfer.

For a dozen years L. Ron Hubbard, founder of the Church of Scientology, and his executive leadership became a maritime-based community named the Sea Organization (Sea Org).  Beginning in 1967 with a complement of four ships, the Sea Org spent most of its existence on the high seas, visiting ports around the world for refueling and resupply. In 1975 much of these operations were shifted to land-based locations.

Marshall Savage discussed building tethered artificial islands in his 1992 book The Millennial Project: Colonizing the Galaxy in Eight Easy Steps, with several color plates illustrating his ideas.

A 1998 essay by Wayne Gramlich attracted the attention of Patri Friedman. The two began working together and posted their first collaborative book online in 2001. Their book explored many aspects of seasteading from waste disposal to flags of convenience.  This collaboration led to the creation of the non-profit The Seasteading Institute (TSI) in 2008.

As an intermediate step, the Seasteading Institute has promoted cooperation with an existing nation on prototype floating islands with legal semi-autonomy within the nation's protected territorial waters.  On 13 January 2017, the Seasteading Institute signed a memorandum of understanding (MOU) with French Polynesia to create the first semi-autonomous "seazone" for a prototype, but later that year political changes driven by the French Polynesia presidential election led to the indefinite postponement of the project. French Polynesia formally backed out of the project and permanently cut ties with Seasteading on 14 March 2018.

The first single-family seastead was launched near Phuket, Thailand by Ocean Builders in March 2019. Two months later, the Thai Navy claimed the seastead was a threat to Thai sovereignty. In 2019, Ocean Builders said it will be building again in Panama, with the support of government officials. As of 2022, the project's status is uncertain.

In April 2019, the concept of floating cities as a way to cope with rising oceans was included in a presentation by the United Nations program UN-Habitat. As presented, they would be limited to sheltered waters.

Specific proposals

The Seasteading Institute

A nonprofit organization that has held several seasteading conferences and started The Floating City Project, which is proposed to locate a floating city within the territorial waters of an existing nation. Attempts to reach an agreement with French Polynesia ended in 2018.

Jounieh Floating Island project (JFIP)
A proposal to build a "floating island" with a luxury hotel in Jounieh north of the Lebanese capital Beirut, was stalled as of 2015 because of concerns from local officials about environmental and regulatory matters.

Blueseed

Blueseed was a company aiming to float a ship near Silicon Valley to serve as a visa-free startup community and entrepreneurial incubator. Blueseed founders Max Marty and Dario Mutabdzija met when both were employees of The Seasteading Institute. The project planned to offer living and office space, high-speed Internet connectivity, and regular ferry service to the mainland but as of 2014 the project was "on hold", and was later described as "failed" due to lack of investors and possible trouble with the Startup Visa Bill before the US Congress, which would make the concept obsolete.

Satoshi
A project which got as far as the purchase of a ship was MS Satoshi, purchased (as Pacific Dawn) in 2020 by Ocean Builders Central, to become a floating residence in the Gulf of Panama; however, after failing to obtain insurance for the proposed operation, the ship was resold in 2021 for cruise operations.

Designs

Historical predecessors and inspirations for seasteading include:
 Oil platforms.
 The Principality of Sealand, a micronation formed on a decommissioned sea fort near Suffolk, England. 
 Smaller floating islands in protected waters, such as Richart Sowa's Spiral Island 
 Floating communities, such as the Uru people on  Lake Titicaca, the Tanka people in Aberdeen, Hong Kong, and the Makoko in Lagos, Nigeria. 
 The non-profit Women on Waves, which operates hospital ships that allow access to abortions for women in countries where abortions are subject to strict laws 
 The Republic of Rose Island, a short-lived micronation on a man-made platform in the Adriatic Sea, 11 kilometres (6.8 mi) off the coast of the province of Rimini, Italy.
 Pirate radio stations anchored in international waters, broadcasting to listeners on shore.

Cruise ships
Cruise ships are a proven technology, and address most of the challenges of living at sea for extended periods of time.  However, they're typically optimized for travel and short-term stay, not for permanent residence in a single location.

Examples:
 Satoshi
 Blue Seed retro-fitted cruise ship.
 Freedom Ship

Spar platform
Platform designs based on spar buoys, similar to oil platforms. In this design, the platforms rest on spars in the shape of floating dumbbells, with the living area high above sea level.  Building on spars in this fashion reduces the influence of wave action on the structure.

Examples:
 TSI Clubstead
 Evolo retrofitted oil platform 
 SeaPod

Modular island 
There are numerous seastead designs based around interlocking modules made of reinforced concrete.  Reinforced concrete is used for floating docks, oil platforms, dams, and other marine structures.

Examples: 
 The Floating City Project / Blue Frontiers.
 Evolo Oceanscraper.
 AT Design Office floating city concept.
 Freedom Haven

Monolithic island 
A single, monolithic structure that is not intended to be expanded or connected to other modules.

Examples: 
 Evolo Seascraper
 SeaOrbiter proposed oceangoing research vessel.

Criticism 
Criticisms have been leveled at both the practicality and desirability of seasteading.

Critics believe that founding and building a government is difficult. Also, seasteads would still be at risk of political interference from nation states.

On a logistical level, without access to culture, travel, restaurants, shopping, and other amenities, seasteads could be too remote and too uncomfortable to be attractive to potential long-term residents. Building seasteads to withstand the rigors of the open ocean may prove uneconomical.

Seastead structures may blight ocean views, their industry or farming may deplete their environments, and their waste may pollute surrounding waters. Some critics believe that seasteads will exploit both residents and the nearby population. Others fear that seasteads will mainly allow wealthy individuals to escape taxes, or to harm mainstream society by ignoring other financial, environmental, and labor regulations.

In popular culture
Seasteading has been imagined many times in novels, from Jules Verne's 1895 science-fiction book Propeller Island (L'Île à hélice) about an artificial island designed to travel the waters of the Pacific Ocean, to the 2003 novel The Scar, which featured a floating city named Armada. It has been a central concept in some movies, notably Waterworld (1995), and in TV series such as Stargate Atlantis, which had a complete floating city. It is a common setting in video games, forming the premise of the Bioshock series, Brink, and Call of Duty: Black Ops II; and in anime, such as Gargantia on the Verdurous Planet which takes place mainly on a traveling city made of an interconnected fleet of ocean ships.

See also

 Floating airport
 Freedom Ship
 Intentional community
 HavenCo
 Mobile offshore base
 Ocean colonization
 Operation Atlantis
 Pneumatic stabilized platform
 Russian floating nuclear power station
 Underwater habitat
 Very large floating structure
 Wolf Hilbertz

References

Further reading

 
 

Artificial islands
Emerging technologies
Floating islands
Steading